Dunia Susi (born 10 August 1987) is an English international footballer. She plays for FA WSL club Notts County and has also represented Great Britain at the World University Games.

Club career
Susi started her footballing career at Enfield Ladies before moving to Arsenal Ladies and later played for Fulham Ladies before joining Chelsea Ladies in the 2006 close season.

She spent the 2008 United States season with Richmond Kickers Destiny, along with Chelsea colleagues Kylie Davies, Emma Delves and Jess O'Dwyer.

In December 2010, Susi was revealed to have signed for Birmingham City's FA WSL squad. She returned to Chelsea after one season away in February 2012. In January 2014 Susi joined Notts County.

International career

England
Susi played for England at Under-19 and Under-23 level. Her debut for the England senior side came in July 2009 when she came on as a substitute for Corinne Yorston in the 2–0 defeat at home to Iceland. Susi's versatility has seen her selected as a right-back for England.

Great Britain Olympic
In June 2012 Susi was as one of four reserves to the 18–player Great Britain squad for the 2012 London Olympics. She was called into the squad as a replacement when Ifeoma Dieke suffered ruptured knee ligaments during Team GB's 3–0 win over Cameroon in the second group match of the games.

Personal life
Susi started her footballing career captaining her schools boys' team. She then moved on to play for Enfield Ladies U-12s and U-14s scoring 96 goals in one season. She joined Arsenal Ladies centre of excellence and moved her way up to the reserve and first-team. Susi made her debut for Arsenal at only 17, coming of the bench against Everton Ladies. In 2005, Susi moved to Fulham for one season in order to gain further first team experience. After scoring 15 goals in only 19 appearances, she moved to Chelsea Ladies. Susi attended the University of Westminster, as a business economics student.

References

1987 births
Living people
English women's footballers
Arsenal W.F.C. players
Fulham L.F.C. players
Notts County L.F.C. players
Chelsea F.C. Women players
Birmingham City W.F.C. players
England women's international footballers
FA Women's National League players
Women's Super League players
2011 FIFA Women's World Cup players
USL W-League (1995–2015) players
England women's under-23 international footballers
Expatriate women's soccer players in the United States
Footballers at the 2012 Summer Olympics
Olympic footballers of Great Britain
Women's association football utility players
Women's association football defenders
Women's association football midfielders
Women's association football forwards